Leucopogon obtectus is a species of flowering plant in the heath family Ericaceae and is endemic to the south-west of Western Australia. The flowers are arranged singly or in pairs in leaf axils and are shorter than the leaves. There are small bracts and broad bracteoles less than half as long as the sepals.

The species was first formally described in 1868 by George Bentham in Flora Australiensis from specimens collected by James Drummond between the Moore and Murchison Rivers. The specific epithet (obtectus) means "protected", referring to the glaucous foliage.

Leucopogon obtectus occurs in the Geraldton Sandplains bioregion of south-western Western Australia and is listed (as Styphelia obtecta) as "Threatened" by the Western Australian Government Department of Biodiversity, Conservation and Attractions, meaning that it is in danger of extinction.

References

obtectus
Ericales of Australia
Flora of Western Australia
Plants described in 1868
Taxa named by George Bentham